Suraj Rawat (born 15 March 1999), is an Indian professional footballer who plays as a midfielder for Sreenidi Deccan in the I-League.

Career
In December 2017, Rawat signed for the Kerala Blasters of the Indian Super League. During the 2017–18 season, Rawat played for the Kerala Blasters Reserves in the I-League 2nd Division. The next season, Rawat was selected for the Kerala Blasters senior squad.

On 7 December 2018, Rawat made his professional debut in a league match against Pune City. He came on as a 89th–minute substitute for Halicharan Narzary as Kerala Blasters lost 0–1.

Career statistics

Club

References

External links 
 Indian Super League Profile

1999 births
Living people
Footballers from Sikkim
Indian footballers
Kerala Blasters FC players
Association football forwards
I-League 2nd Division players
Indian Super League players
India youth international footballers
Indian Arrows players
Mohammedan SC (Kolkata) players
Kerala Blasters FC Reserves and Academy players
Sreenidi Deccan FC players